The Xi'an–Baoji high-speed railway, or Xibao Passenger Dedicated Line is a high-speed railway operated by China Railway High-speed between Xi'an and Baoji, in Shaanxi province. It is a section of the Xuzhou–Lanzhou high-speed railway, and largely parallels the Xi'an–Baoji section of the Longhai Railway.

Construction work on the Xi'an–Baoji high-speed railway started on December 11, 2009. The opening date was 28th Dec, 2013. The total investment of the project is estimated to be CN¥17.967 billion.

References 

High-speed railway lines in China
Rail transport in Shaanxi
Standard gauge railways in China
3